Arcadia, Texas, may refer to:

Arcadia, Santa Fe, Texas, a neighborhood in Santa Fe, Galveston County, Texas
Arcadia, Shelby County, Texas